In the 2011–12 football season, English club Newcastle United competed in the Premier League for the second consecutive season. It was Newcastle United's 119th season of professional football.

In this season, Newcastle finished in fifth place in the Premier League, thus qualifying for the following season's Europa League. After going through their first 11 games unbeaten, Newcastle then failed to win in six consecutive games in November and December, mainly due to a spate of injuries among key defenders. The team recorded a resounding 3–0 home win over champions Manchester United in January and were hammered 5–0 by Tottenham Hotspur in February. The January transfer window saw the arrival of Senegalese striker Papiss Cissé, who quickly became a core part of the team, scoring 13 goals in 14 appearances.

This article shows statistics and lists details of all matches played by the club during the season.

Chronological list of events
25 May 2011: Sol Campbell and Shefki Kuqi are released on a free transfer while Lens youngster Mehdi Abeid agrees a deal to be completed on 1 July.

27 May 2011: Shane Ferguson is handed a new five-year deal.

6 June 2011: New contracts are offered to Michael Richardson and Ryan Donaldson, but Paddy McLaughlin, Daniel Leadbitter, Matthew Grieve and Aaron Spear are released at the end of the season.

10 June 2011: Yohan Cabaye is signed from Lille for an undisclosed fee. The fee though is reported to be £4.3 million by several media outlets.

16 June 2011: Kevin Nolan's transfer to West Ham United is completed for an undisclosed fee. The fee is believed to be £3 million but could rise to £4 million.

17 June 2011: West Ham striker Demba Ba signs for Newcastle on a three-year deal on a free transfer.

18 June 2011: Newcastle agree to sign winger Sylvain Marveaux on a five-year deal on 1 July 2011 when his contract with Rennes expires.

23 June 2011: Ben Tozer is released and signed by Northampton Town on a two-year deal.

1 July 2011: Newcastle sign young French midfielder Mehdi Abeid on a five-year deal after his Lens contract expires.

15 July 2011: Newcastle begin pre-season with a 2–0 win away at Darlington. Newcastle's second goal, scored by Sammy Ameobi, caused a pitch invasion which held up the game for ten minutes.

16 July 2011: Midfielder Kazenga LuaLua rejoins Brighton & Hove Albion on loan until 15 January 2012.

21 July 2011: Newcastle begin their pre-season tour of the United States with a 0–0 draw against Sporting Kansas City.
24 July 2011: The Magpies' second match in the U.S. ends in a 1–0 loss to Orlando City in Orlando, Florida.
27 July 2011: Alan Pardew's team finish their tour of the U.S. with a 3–0 win over the Columbus Crew with goals from Shola Ameobi, Fabricio Coloccini and Haris Vučkić.
31 July 2011: Newcastle's first match back in England sees them lose 3–2 to Championship outfit Leeds United at Elland Road, despite goals from Steven Taylor and Haris Vukčić.
2 August 2011: Newcastle announce that their midfielder Joey Barton has been transfer listed and will be allowed to leave the club on a free transfer.

4 August 2011: Wayne Routledge completes move to Swansea City.

5 August 2011: Midfielder Michael Richardson joins Leyton Orient on an initial one-month loan deal.

6 August 2011: The Magpies's only friendly at St James' Park, against Italian giants Fiorentina, is abandoned after 63 minutes due to players slipping over the pitch because of heavy rain.
9 August 2011: Newcastle complete the signing of Manchester United midfielder Gabriel Obertan on a five-year deal.

11 August 2011: Defender James Tavernier joins Carlisle United on an initial one-month loan deal and striker Phil Airey joins Hibernian on a six-month loan deal.

11 August 2011: Striker Xisco rejoins former club Deportivo de La Coruña on loan until the end of the season.

12 August 2011: Jose Enrique is signed by Liverpool for a reported £6 million.

13 August 2011:  The Magpies Start the 2011–12 Premier League season with an impressive 0–0 draw at home to Arsenal, who dominate chances forcing stand-in goalkeeper Tim Krul to make plenty of saves.
17 August 2011: Goalkeeper Fraser Forster re-joins Celtic on a season-long loan.

20 August 2011: A free-kick goal from Ryan Taylor gives Newcastle a 1–0 win at local rivals Sunderland, who have Phil Bardsley sent off late on. The win sends Alan Pardew's team top of the Premier League for 45 minutes until Liverpool's shock 2–0 win at Arsenal.
25 August 2011: In the second round of League Cup, Newcastle come from behind to beat League One side Scunthorpe United 2–1 at Glanford Park with another excellent free-kick from Ryan Taylor as well as Sammy Ameobi's first goal for the club, coming in extra-time.
26 August 2011: Joey Barton completes a move to Queens Park Rangers on a free transfer.

28 August 2011: A brace From Leon Best, including a Goal of The Month contender, gives the Tynesiders a 2–1 win over Fulham.
30 August 2011: Left-back Davide Santon is signed from Inter Milan for an expected fee of £5 million.

30 August 2011: Goalkeeper Rob Elliot is signed from Charlton Athletic on a five-year deal for an undisclosed fee.

12 September 2011: Joey Barton makes his QPR debut against former club Newcastle in a goalless draw at Loftus Road.
16 September 2011: Midfielder/striker Ryan Donaldson joins Tranmere Rovers on a one-month loan.

17 September 2011: Former Newcastle goalkeeper Shay Given makes a number saves for Aston Villa in a 1–1 draw with Newcastle at Villa Park.
20 September 2011: A dramatic League Cup Third Round tie at Championship strugglers Nottingham Forest sees the Magpies win 4–3 after extra-time.
24 September 2011: Demba Ba scores his first three Newcastle goals in a 3–1 win over Blackburn Rovers just three hours after the two teams were drawn together for the fourth round of the League Cup.
30 September 2011: Goalkeeper Ole Söderberg joins Darlington on a one-month loan.

1 October 2011: After a Demba Ba header puts Newcastle in front against Wolverhampton Wanderers at Molineux Stadium, Jonás Gutiérrez scores another solo goal in 2–1 win over the West Midlanders who had a goal disallowed in stoppage time denying them a point.
16 October 2011: After Rafael van der Vaart penalty, followed by a Demba Ba equaliser, two excellent strikes from Jermain Defoe and Shola Ameobi mean Newcastle's match with Tottenham Hotpspur at St James' Park finishes 2–2.
22 October 2011: Yohan Cabaye's first goal for the club gives Newcastle a narrow 1–0 win over struggling Wigan Athletic and keep the club's unbeaten to 14 games in all competitions, going back to early May.
24 October 2011: Goalkeeper Steve Harper joins Brighton & Hove Albion on a one-month loan.

26 October 2011: Newcastle's unbeaten run ends in the Fourth Round of the League Cup against Blackburn. There are three controversial penalty decisions in the match (two for Blackburn, one for Newcastle), with each penalty scored, but Blackburn's Gaël Givet nonetheless scores an extra-time winner, despite offside calls from the Magpies.
31 October 2011: Exactly a year after thrashing local rivals Sunderland 5–1, with Kevin Nolan scoring a hat-trick, Demba Ba scores all three Newcastle goals in a 3–1 win at Stoke City, giving Tony Pulis's side their first home defeat of the season.
5 November 2011: A John Heitinga own goal and a screamer from Ryan Taylor give Newcastle a 2–1 win over Everton, putting the Magpies second in the Premier League until Manchester United's 1–0 home win over Sunderland.
19 November 2011: Newcastle's unbeaten run comes to an end with a 3–1 defeat at league leaders and eventual champions Manchester City; Dan Gosling's first Newcastle goal in the 89th minute is only a consolation for the Magpies.
21 November 2011: Kazenga LuaLua joins Brighton on a permanent deal for an undisclosed fee while James Tavernier joins Sheffield Wednesday and Nile Ranger joins Barnsley on loan deals until January.

26 November 2011: After a goalless first-half against defending champions Manchester United at Old Trafford, a goal from Javier Hernández and a Demba Ba penalty before Jonás Gutiérrez's red card Tim Krul makes a lot of saves in stoppage time although the home side's goalscorer has another goal disallowed.
27 November 2011: The death of Newcastle legend Gary Speed shocks the football world; BBC News reported that the Wales national team manager had committed suicide.
3 December 2011: Newcastle suffer their first home defeat of the season as Chelsea put in a superb performance in a 3–0 win, although Tim Krul saved a Frank Lampard penalty. Blues defender David Luiz was lucky not to be sent off for an early foul on Demba Ba
4 December 2011: Newcastle are drawn at home to Blackburn for the Third Round of the FA Cup.
10 December 2011: Despite another two goals from Demba Ba, Newcastle crash to a 4–2 defeat at Norwich City. This is the first time since March they have suffered two successive Premier League losses, meaning Alan Pardew's team go down to seventh in the Premier League.
17 December 2011: Excellent saves from Dutch goalkeepers Tim Krul and Michel Vorm mean Newcastle are held to a goalless draw at home to Swansea; Ba goes closest with a scissor kick which hit the post.
21 December 2011: Newcastle's longest winless run of the season extends to six games with a shock 3–2 loss to West Bromwhich Albion, who extend their unbeaten away run to three games.
26 December 2011: The Magpies end their winless run and claim their first Boxing Day win since 2001 by beating 19th-placed Bolton Wanderers 2–0 with two excellent goals in two minutes from Hatem Ben Arfa and Demba Ba.
30 December 2011: Despite taking the lead at Anfield through an own goal by Daniel Agger, although Liverpool come back to win 3–1 via a brace from former Newcastle favourite Craig Bellamy and a fantastic goal from captain Steven Gerrard.
4 January 2012: Virgin Money replaced Northern Rock as sponsor under Northern Rock's current deal; Virgin signed a new two-year deal to be the shirt sponsor for the club. In their first Virgin-sponsored game Newcastle beat Manchester United 3–0.
7 January 2012: After falling behind at home to Blackburn in the FA Cup, two excellent goals from Hatem Ben Arfa – who would win ESPN's Player of the Round – and Jonás Gutiérrez in stoppage time win the game 2–1 for Newcastle.
8 January 2012: In the first FA Cup Fourth Round tie to be drawn, the Magpies are given a trip to shock Championship promotion challengers Brighton.
15 January 2012: Leon Best scores his first goal since September in a 1–0 win over QPR, taking the Magpies back up to sixth.
17 January 2012: Papiss Cissé signs for Newcastle United on a -year deal for around £8 million.

21 January 2012: After Danny Guthrie's first half screamer (his first of the season), a nightmare second-half, including a Clint Dempsey hat-trick and a Mike Williamson red card, mean Newcastle suffer a 5–2 loss to Fulham at Craven Cottage.
28 January 2012: Just a week after his red card at Fulham (suspensions only for Premier League matches), Mike Williamson scores an own goal as Newcastle suffer a shock FA Cup Fourth Round loss at Brighton, the second year the centre-back has netted an own goal in a Newcastle FA Cup loss to lower league opposition.
29 January 2012: Midfielder Alan Smith joins Milton Keynes Dons on loan until the end of the season.

31 January 2012: Defender James Tavernier joins Milton Keynes Dons on loan until the end of the season.

1 February 2012: In Newcastle's last match without Demba Ba, Papiss Cissé and Cheik Tioté, they beat Blackburn 2–0, the second time in three-and-a-half weeks and the third time this season they have beaten Steve Kean's side (in all competitions). Goals came from a Scott Dann own goal and Gabriel Obertan's first Premier League goal. Goalkeeper Tim Krul also saved a David Dunn penalty.
5 February 2012: Demba Ba scores on his return to the Premier League against Aston Villa. After a Robbie Keane equaliser, Papiss Cissé scores a half-volley on his debut resulting in a 2–1 win that moves the Tynesiders up to fifth.
11 February 2012: After being touted as major UEFA Champions League contenders, Newcastle traveled to White Hart Lane and incurred an in-form Spurs side who ripped the normally solid Newcastle formation apart to hammer them 5–0 (4–0 at half time), the Magpies' biggest defeat of the season.
25 February 2012: Newcastle lose a 2–0 lead at home to Wolves and are held to a 2–2 draw; Chelsea take advantage and beat Bolton 3–0.
4 March 2012: In a tense Tyne-Wear Derby against Sunderland, Newcastle go a goal down after Nicklas Bendtner converts a penalty. Demba Ba misses a penalty, but Shola Ameobi's late equaliser earns the Magpies a point in the 1–1 draw.
12 March 2012: After Hatem Ben Arfa gives Newcastle the lead against Arsenal, the Gunners become the first club to win four consecutive Premier League matches from behind, having already done it against Sunderland, Tottenham and Liverpool; their goals against Newcastle were from Robin van Persie and Thomas Vermaelen.
18 March 2012: Papiss Cissé scores the only goal of Newcastle's 1–0 win over Norwich, helping them close the gap on Chelsea and ending a four-game winless run and starting a run of six consecutive wins.
22 March 2012: Nile Ranger joins Sheffield Wednesday on loan until the end of the season.

25 March 2012: A fantastic first-half performance against West Brom sees an excellent goal each for Hatem Ben Arfa and Papiss Cissé and a tap-in for the Senegalese striker mean the Magpies are 3–0 up at half-time. A Shane Long consolation for West Brom mean Pardew's side win 3–1.
1 April 2012: Two excellent goals from Papiss Cissé help Newcastle to a 2–0 win over Liverpool, who have goalkeeper Pepe Reina sent off, forcing former Newcastle defender José Enrique to play goal.
4 April 2012: James Tavernier is recalled early from his loan spell with MK Dons.

6 April 2012: Two more goals from Papiss Cissé, including a sublime chip, help Newcastle to a 2–0 win at Swansea, taking the Magpies up to fifth before Chelsea's controversial win over Wigan the following day.
9 April 2012: A solo goal from Ben Arfa and a Cissé goal give Newcastle a 2–0 win over struggling Bolton, taking the Magpies back up to fifth.
14 April 2012: Liverpool reach the FA Cup final at the expense of Everton. The result guarantees Newcastle UEFA Europa League football for the 2012–13 season if they finish between fifth and seventh.
21 April 2012: Newcastle's 3–0 victory against Stoke guarantees them finishing sixth place or higher in the Premier League, meaning they are certain to at least play in the Europa League during the 2012–13 season.
28 April 2012: Newcastle travel to Wigan after six consecutive wins, but lose 4–0, with all goals scored in the first-half.
2 May 2012: Newcastle record their first league win against Chelsea at Stamford Bridge since 1986, 2–0. Both goals are scored by Cissé, including the goal which would win the Goal of the Season award in stoppage time.
6 May 2012: Two excellent second-half goals from Yaya Touré mean Pardew's team slip to a 2–0 loss at home to eventual champions Manchester City in front of 52,389 spectators, the biggest ever Premier League attendance at St James' Park.
8 May 2012: Liverpool's shock 4–1 win over Chelsea means Newcastle are guaranteed to finish above both teams in the Premier League.
11 May 2012: Alan Pardew wins Premier League Manager of the Season and the League Managers Association of the Year.
13 May 2012: Newcastle miss out on a Champions League place after a 3–1 loss at Everton on the final day of the season, as well as Arsenal's 3–2 win at West Brom and Tottenham's 2–0 win over Fulham. Spurs, however, miss out on a Champions League spot after sixth-placed Chelsea win the Champions League six days later, guaranteeing them a spot in the 2012–13 Champions League as defending champions which comes at the expense of Spurs, who instead go into the Europa League.

Club

Team kit
Puma will be supplying the team kits for a final season, unless they extend their current contract. Puma will be designing three new kits for Newcastle. The initial kit sponsor was Northern Rock, who entered their ninth year of sponsoring the team. In 2011, a clause was triggered to end Northern Rock's deal early at the end of this season. On 1 January 2012, Virgin Money bought Northern Rock and on 4 January, Virgin replaced Northern Rock as sponsor, as well as signing a new two-year deal to sponsor the shirt.

Coaching staff

Players

First-team
Squad at end of season

Left club during season

Reserves
The following players did not appear for the first team this season.

Youth team

Trialists
The following players came to Newcastle as trialists this season.

Statistics

Appearances and goals
Last updated on 14 May 2012.

|-
|colspan="14"|Players no longer at the club:

|}

Top scorers

Cards
Accounts for all competitions. Last updated on 6 May 2012.

Starting formations
Accounts for all competitions. Last updated on 6 May 2012.

Captains
Accounts for all competitions. Last updated on 6 May 2012.

Transfers

In

 Total spending:  ~ £23,850,000

Out

 Total income:  ~ £13,000,000

Loans in

Loans out

Competitions

Pre-season

Premier League

League table

Results summary

Matches

FA Cup

League Cup

References

2011-12
2011–12 Premier League by team